Cédric Pioline was the defending champion but lost in the first round to Andreas Vinciguerra.

Nicolas Escudé won in the final 7–5, 3–6, 7–6(7–5) against Roger Federer.

Seeds
A champion seed is indicated in bold text while text in italics indicates the round in which that seed was eliminated.

  Marat Safin (first round)
  Yevgeny Kafelnikov (second round)
  Àlex Corretja (quarterfinals)
  Tim Henman (second round)
  Arnaud Clément (second round)
  Dominik Hrbatý (second round)
  Sébastien Grosjean (second round)
  Juan Carlos Ferrero (first round)

Draw

Qualifying

Seeds 

 Nicolas Escudé (qualified)
 Sláva Doseděl (qualified)
 Ivan Ljubičić (qualified)
 Jens Knippschild (qualified)
 Rogier Wassen (first round)
 Tomas Behrend (second round)
 Tuomas Ketola (second round)
 Ján Krošlák (second round)

Qualified 

 Nicolas Escudé
 Sláva Doseděl
 Ivan Ljubičić
 Jens Knippschild

First qualifier

Second qualifier

Third qualifier

Fourth qualifier

External links
 2001 ABN AMRO World Tennis Tournament Singles draw

2001 ABN AMRO World Tennis Tournament
Singles